Baltisches Wappenbuch (full name: "Baltisches Wappenbuch: Wappen sämmtlicher, den Ritterschaften von Livland, Estland, Kurland und Oesel zugehöriger Adelsgeschlechten"; in English: The Baltic Armorial) consists of coat of arms of Baltic-German noble families. The book was edited by Carl Arvid von Klingspor and illustrated by Adolf Matthias Hildebrandt.

In total, it consists of 798 coat of arms.

References

 Anna Gertrud, född 1721-09-21, död ogift 1775-12-29. Hon visade tidigt håg för teckning och utförde en vapenbok över livländska adeln, innehållande 396 vapen, vilken förvaras på riddarhuset i Riga. (deutsch: ...erarbeitete ein Wappenbuch über die Livländische Ritterschaft, welches 396 Wappen beinhaltet und im Ritterhaus zu Riga aufbewahrt wird). In: Adelsvapen-Wiki, Adliga ätten von Vegesack nr 679 TAB 20 [1]
 Baltische Historische Kommission (Hrsg.): Eintrag zu Johann Eberhard Neimbts. In: BBLD – Baltisches biografisches Lexikon digital
 Paul Eduard Damier: Wappen-Buch sämmtlicher zur ehstländischen Adelsmatrikel gehöriger Familien. Reval 1837, (Onlinefassung)
 Ernst David Schabert, Vollstaendiges Wappenbuch des Kurlaendischen Adels, unter Aufsicht der für die Bearbeitung der ritterschaftlichen Genealogien niedergesetzten Kommission, lithographirt und herausgegeben [2]

External links
Book in database called DIGAR, downloadable
Carl Arvid Klingspor: Baltisches Wappenbuch Wappen sämmtlicher, den Ritterschaften von Livland, Estland, Kurland und Oesel zugehörigen Adelsgeschlechter, Stockholm 1882 
Genealogisches Handbuch und Wappenbuch der Baltischen Ritterschaften
Baltisches Wappenbuch. Auf: Adelsvapen-Wiki (schwedisch)

1882 books
Baltic nobility